Charles Roy Meeker (September 15, 1900 – March 25, 1929) was a professional baseball player.  He was a left-handed pitcher over parts of three seasons (1923–24, 1926) with the Philadelphia Athletics and Cincinnati Reds.  For his career, he compiled an 8–14 record, with a 4.73 earned run average, and 54 strikeouts in 192 innings pitched.

He was born in Lead Mine, Missouri, and at the time of his death was living in Kansas City. Meeker died of a heart attack in Orlando, Florida at the age of 28 while taking part in the Reds' spring training.

References 

1900 births
1929 deaths
Philadelphia Athletics players
Cincinnati Reds players
Major League Baseball pitchers
Baseball players from Missouri
Birmingham Barons players
Columbia Comers players
Portland Beavers players
Columbus Senators players